The 1996 Western Kentucky Hilltoppers football team represented Western Kentucky University in the 1996 NCAA Division I-AA football season and were led by quarterback Willie Taggart and head coach Jack Harbaugh. The team was an independent and primarily ran an option offense. Their schedule included top-ranked and eventual undefeated NCAA Division I-AA champion, Marshall.  Western Kentucky's roster featured future National Football League (NFL) player Ben Wittman. Joey Stockton and Mike Mills were named to All-American teams.  The I-AA Independent All-Star Team included Antwan Floyd, Trae Hackett, Stockton, Turner Goodwin, and Mills.

Schedule

References

Western Kentucky
Western Kentucky Hilltoppers football seasons
Western Kentucky Hilltoppers football